Ulla Elisabet Trenter Palm (née Anderson; 18 December 1936 – 23 December 2019) was a Swedish author.  She was born in Stockholm. She was married to Stieg Trenter from 1960 until his death in 1967, and their daughter is Laura Trenter. Ulla Trenter was active as a politician in the Centre Party.

Ulla Trenter was the daughter of the clerk Lennart Anderson and director Elisabet, unmarried Kindgren. She first married in 1960 to the author Stieg Trenter, with whom she had three children, including author Laura Trenter. After the death of the first husband, she remarried in 1969 with the Chancellor Johan Palm (1930-1999).

Bibliography
1967 - Rosenkavaljeren (started by Stieg Trenter)
1968 - Kungens lilla piga
1969 - Påfågeln
1970 - Odjuret
1971 - Gästen
1972 - Skatten
1973 - Kedjan
1974 - Sov i ro
1975 - Tigerhajen
1976 - Drakblodet
1977 - En gång är ingen gång
1978 - De dödas lott
1979 - Kartan
1979 - Mariefred Staden Slottet Omgivningarna (together with Harry Karlsson)
1980 - Skyddsänglarna
1981 - Roten till det onda
1982 - Döda rummet
1983 - Rika barn leka häst
1984 - Grodmuggen
1985 - Som man bäddar
1986 - Värsta möjliga tystnad
1987 - En död liten stuga
1988 - Döden i rikssalen
1989 - De röda cirklarna
1991 - Sköna juveler
1999 - Lustmord (together with Inger Jalakas)

References

Further reading 
 

1936 births
2019 deaths
Writers from Stockholm
Swedish crime fiction writers
Centre Party (Sweden) politicians